Kadala Mage (Son of the Sea) is a 2006 Indian Tulu language film directed by Praveen Jain and produced by Sadhana N Shetty, starring Bhavya, Diganth (in his Tulu debut), Soorya, Sarita Jain, Rajesh Bantwal, Bhojaraj Vamanjoor, Lakshman Kumar Mallur, Sarojini Shetty and Ila Vitla in the lead roles. The film was a box office success and won the Karnataka State Film Award for Best Regional Film. Kadala Mage was one of two Tulu films to release in 2006 along with Suddha (2006). The film was not released on CDs as of 2011.

Cast 
Bhavya
Diganth as Arun
Soorya as Karna
Sarita Jain as Anjali
Rajesh Bantwal
Bhojaraj Vamanjoor
Lakshman
Kumar Mallur
Sarojini Shetty
Ila Vitla 
Winny Fernandes

Soundtrack

References

2006 films
Tulu-language films